Boundary-Layer Meteorology is a monthly peer-reviewed scientific journal published by Springer Science+Business Media. It was established in 1970 by R. E. Munn (University of Toronto). The current editors-in-chief are Evgeni Fedorovich (University of Oklahoma) and William Anderson (University of Texas at Dallas). According to the Journal Citation Reports, the journal has a 2020 impact factor of 2.949. It covers fundamental research on physical, chemical, and biological processes occurring within the atmospheric boundary layer, the lowest few kilometres of the Earth's atmosphere.

References

External links
 

Springer Science+Business Media academic journals
Publications established in 1970
Meteorology journals
English-language journals
Monthly journals